The Battle of Diamond Hill (Donkerhoek) was an engagement of the Second Boer War that took place on 11 and 12 June 1900 in central Transvaal.

Background 
The Boer forces retreated to the east by the time the capital of the South African Republic (Transvaal), Pretoria, was captured by British forces on 5 June 1900. British Commander-in-Chief in South Africa Field Marshal Lord Roberts had predicted a Boer surrender upon the loss of their capital, but when this was not fulfilled, he began an attack to the east in order to push Boer forces away from Pretoria and enable an advance to the Portuguese East Africa border.

Prelude 
The commandant-general of Transvaal, Louis Botha, established a 40-kilometer north to south defensive line 29 kilometers east of Pretoria; his forces numbered up to 6,000 men and 30 guns. The Pretoria–Delagoa Bay rail line ran eastward through the center of the Boer position. Personnel from the South African Republic Police manned positions at Donkerpoort just south of the railway in the hills at Pienaarspoort, while other troops held positions at Donkerhoek and Diamond Hill.  Botha commanded the Boer centre and left flank and General Koos de la Rey commanded north of the railway line.

Weakened by the long march to Pretoria and the loss of horses and sick men, the British force mustered only 14,000, a third of whom were mounted on wobbly horses. 

He despatched Robert Broadwood's 2nd Cavalry Brigade, which included the 10th Royal Hussars, 12th Royal Lancers and the Household Cavalry Regiment, on a Special Mission.

As the sun came up it was a "bitterly cold Monday morning...we are hidden in the hills at Donkerhoek...ready for battle..." confided Botha to his diary.

Battle 
The cavalry of John French with Edward Hutton's brigade attacked on the left in an attempt to outflank the Boers to the north, while the infantry of Ian Hamilton with Lieutenant Colonel Beauvoir De Lisle's corps attempted an outflanking movement on the right. In the center, the infantry of Reginald Pole-Carew advanced towards the Boer center, with the gap between Pole-Carew and French covered by Colonel St.G.C. Henry's corps of mounted infantry.

On the left, the cavalry of French entered a valley and attracted fire from three sides.  De Lisle's corps was similarly pinned down on the right flank in a horseshoe-shaped group of hills. As a detachment of 10th Hussars swung off to the right, they were attacked from Diamond Hill.  A section of Q Battery RHA attempted to return artillery fire, but had no infantry support, until the 12th Lancers arrived on the front line. Lord Airlie took 60 men to clear the Boers from the guns, and in the ensuing exchange of rifle fire at short-range, Lord Airlie was killed.  The Boers pressed the matter hard.  Two squadrons of the Household Cavalry Regiment and one squadron of the 12th Hussars charged at full gallop at Boers firing from concealed positions. The enemy dispersed. Following the indecisive results of 11 June, Roberts decided to make a frontal attack on the next morning.

The morning of 12 June with artillery fire from guns escorted to forward positions by a squadron of New South Wales Mounted Rifles led by Captain Maurice Hilliard, allowing a Regular infantry advance that captured Diamond Hill. A counterattack was planned by Botha, supported with fire from Rhenosterfontein Hill. The regular Mounted Infantry from De Lisle's corps advanced to a farm, where two rapid firing pom-poms were positioned, supported by the Western Australian Mounted Infantry of Hatherley Moor. The hill was attacked by the New South Wales Mounted Rifles, who trotted across the plain in extended order, then increased to a gallop under Boer fire before they dismounted at the base of the hill. The mounted rifles advanced up the hill and charged the Boer defenders, forcing the latter to retreat. They held the hill despite Boer artillery fire, which forced Botha to call off the counterattack, as British artillery fire from the hill carried the potential to confusion with the Boer retreat. Among those killed in the attack were Lieutenants Percy Drage and William Harriott of the New South Wales Mounted Rifles.

On the morning of 13 June De Lisle's corps pursued the retreating Boers until they expended their ammunition and received artillery fire in return.

Aftermath 
On 13th the Botha's army retreated to the north, they were chased as far as Elands River Station, only 25 miles from Pretoria, by Mounted Infantry and De Lisle's Australians. Although Roberts had removed the Boer threat to his eastern flank, the Boers were unbowed despite their retreat. Jan Smuts wrote that the battle had "an inspiriting effect which could scarcely have been improved by a real victory."

Forty-four years after the battle, British General Ian Hamilton opined in his memoirs that "the battle, which ensured that the Boers could not recapture Pretoria, was the turning point of the war".  Hamilton credited war correspondent Winston Churchill with recognizing that the key to victory would be in storming the summit, and risking his life to signal Hamilton.

Order of battle

British Forces

References

Bibliography
 Brian Kelly, Best Little Stories from the Life and Times of Winston Churchill Cumberland House Publishing, 2008
 Sir George Arthur, The Story of the Household Cavalry 1887–1900, vol.III
  – Official history
 
 
 Ben Viljoen, My Reminiscences of the Anglo-Boer War, (Hood, Douglas and Howard 1902)
 
 

Battles of the Second Boer War
June 1900 events
Conflicts in 1900
1900 in South Africa
Battles involving Canada
Battles involving Australia